Jefferson David Tabinas (born August 7, 1998) is a professional footballer who plays as a centre-back or a left-back for J2 League club Mito HollyHock. Born in Japan, he represents the Philippines national team.

Club career

Youth career
Born in Japan, he spent his youth with FC WASEDA and FC Tripleter before captaining Kirimitsu Gakuen High School.

Kawasaki Frontale
After the high school tournament, he was signed by J1 League club Kawasaki Frontale for the 2017 season. Kawasaki Frontale won the 2017 and 2018 seasons of the J1 League, but Tabinas had no appearances for the team.

Loan to Gifu
In the 2019 season, he was loaned out to FC Gifu of the J2 League. He made his first J.League appearance in a match against Ehime FC on 7 April, where they lost 2–0. He made his Emperor's Cup debut when they entered in the second round on 3 July and were eliminated by Ventforet Kofu. Tabinas made seven more league appearances, however, the club finished at the bottom of the table and were relegated.

Loan to Gamba Osaka U23
He spent the 2020 season on loan with Gamba Osaka U-23 in the J3 League.

Mito HollyHock
In January 2021, he transferred to Mito HollyHock of the J2 League. He scored his first J.League goal in a 2–2 draw with Renofa Yamaguchi on 17 October.

International career
Born in Japan to a Ghanaian father and a Filipino mother, Tabinas is eligible to present Japan, Ghana or Philippines at international level.

In 2016, Tabinas expressed his desire to represent Japan at the 2020 Tokyo Olympics.

Philippines
In May 2021, he was called up to the Philippines national team for the joint qualifiers of the 2022 FIFA World Cup and 2023 AFC Asian Cup. He made his debut on 7 June in a 2–0 defeat to China PR in Sharjah, UAE.

Personal life
Tabinas was born in Japan to a Ghanaian father and Filipino mother. His younger brother, Paul, is also a footballer.

References

External links

1998 births
Living people
People from Shinjuku
Citizens of the Philippines through descent
Filipino footballers
Philippines international footballers
Filipino people of Ghanaian descent
Sportspeople of Ghanaian descent
Japanese people of Ghanaian descent
Japanese people of Filipino descent
Association football defenders
Kawasaki Frontale players
FC Gifu players
Gamba Osaka players
Gamba Osaka U-23 players
Mito HollyHock players
J1 League players
J2 League players
J3 League players